Ablekuma West is one of the 275 constituencies represented in the Parliament of Ghana. It elects one Member of Parliament (MP) by the first past the post system of election. Ablekuma West is located in the Accra Metropolis in the Greater Accra Region of Ghana. The member elected at the 2012 general election was Ursula Owusu of the New Patriotic Party (NPP).

History and boundaries
Ablekuma West was one of 45 newly created constituencies for the 2012 general election. It covers the districts of Dansoman, Sahara, Gbegbeyise, Agege, Glefe, Opetekwe and Shiabu. Before the 2016 general election, incumbent MP Ursula Owusu was challenged in an NPP primary election by constituency chairman Theophilus Tettey Enyo and businessman Roni Nicole. The primary proved controversial, with disputes over voting registers used resulting in legal challenges by party members and Enyo's withdrawal. Owusu beat Nicole by 554 votes to 317, with up to 400 members reported to have boycotted the contest in protest.

Members of Parliament

Elections

References

Parliamentary constituencies in the Greater Accra Region
2012 establishments in Ghana
Constituencies established in 2012